Heart Like a Sky is the sixth studio album by English new wave band Spandau Ballet, released on 18 September 1989 by CBS Records. The album was mainly distributed in continental Europe. It was the group's last release before disbanding and is their last to be composed of new material.

Track listing

Personnel

Spandau Ballet
 Tony Hadley – lead and backing vocals, arrangements (1–4, 6–9)
 Gary Kemp – guitars, backing vocals, arrangements (1–4, 6–9)
 Steve Norman – guitars, saxophones, arrangements
 Martin Kemp – bass, arrangements (1–4, 6–9)
 John Keeble – drums, drum programming, arrangements (1–4, 6–9)

Additional musicians
 Toby Chapman – keyboards, programming, backing vocals, arrangements (1–4, 6–9)
 Luís Jardim – percussion (1, 5, 7, 9)
 Deuce Barter – arrangements (5)

The Phantom Horns
 Gary Barnacle – saxophones 
 Peter Thoms – trombone 
 John Thirkell – trumpet, flugelhorn 
 Luke Tunney – trumpet

Technical
 Gary Kemp – production (1–4, 6–9)
 Gary Langan – production (1–4, 6–9)
 Spandau Ballet – production
 John Brough – engineering
 Matt Howe – engineering assistance
 Noel Rafferty – engineering assistance
 Richard Sullivan – engineering assistance
 Jeremy Wheatley – engineering assistance
 Tom Lord-Alge – mixing
 Peter Dyer – design
 Nick Bell – design assistance
 David Band – painting
 David Scheinmann – photography
 Mixed at The Hit Factory (New York City) and Larrabee Sound Studios (North Hollywood, California)

Charts

Certifications

References

1989 albums
Albums recorded at Olympic Sound Studios
CBS Records albums
Spandau Ballet albums